Ocho is the Spanish word for eight.

Ocho may also refer to:

 Ōchō, a Japanese era name
 Ocho, a figure "eight" in Argentine tango dance
 Mount Ōchō, a peak in Okuetsu Kōgen Prefectural Natural Park in Japan

Media
 "Ocho", a song by 2Face Idibia from the album Grass 2 Grace
 "Ocho", a song by Omar Rodríguez-López from the album Un Corazón de Nadie
 Ocho, a character in the television cartoon The Amazing World of Gumball
 The Ocho, the nickname of ESPN8, a fictional television network in the film Dodgeball: A True Underdog Story

See also 
 
 Canal Ocho (disambiguation), television channels numbered 8
 Calle Ocho, a street in Little Havana, Miami
 Ocho Rios, a town in Jamaica
 Otcho, a character in the 20th Century Boys manga series
 Otcho, the native name of the island of Bioko
 Oucho (disambiguation)
 Octo (disambiguation)